The table below lists the reasons delivered from the bench by the Supreme Court of Canada during 1999. The table illustrates what reasons were filed by each justice in each case, and which justices joined each reason. This list, however, does not include decisions on motions.

Of the 73 judgments released in 1999, 12 were oral, and 42 were unanimous. There were also 5 motions.

Reasons

Justices of the Supreme Court

Key

Notes

External links
 1999 decisions: CanLII LexUM

Reasons Of The Supreme Court Of Canada, 1999
1999